Maerdy is a village and community (and electoral ward) in the county borough of Rhondda Cynon Taf, and within the historic county boundaries of Glamorgan, Wales, lying at the head of the Rhondda Fach Valley.

History 
"Maerdy" is a Welsh word meaning "house of the STEWARD", and may indicate a medieval origin. The "maer" (steward) was usually appointed by the king; the maer biswail (literally the "dung steward") was not as important and wielded less authority than the "maer" (Hen Gyfreithiau Cymreig, S. J. Williams). "Maerdy" was also used for a 'summer dwelling' as well as for a 'dairy farm' (GPC). The name is found in several locations throughout Wales. 'Mardy' represents the local Gwentian dialect form of the written "maerdy". 

The area grew from a farming community to town around the coal mining industry and the development of Mardy Colliery in the late 19th century, but its last pit (Mardy Main) shut in 1990. Maerdy was not originally an area of industrial confrontation, with the Cambrian mines of Pentre showing far more socialist ideals. This view would change by the mid to late 20th century when Maerdy became synonymous with working class syndicalism and solidarity. In the mid-twentieth century Maerdy was associated with the Communist Party of Great Britain and radical miners' leaders such as Arthur Horner and was known as Little Moscow. By the time of the Miners' strike in the 1980s, Maerdy was the location of one of the last working mines in the south Wales valleys, and the pictures of the returning miners once the strike was resolved was one of the defining moments of late 20th century Welsh history.

Maerdy has a number of memorials erected to remember events of significance and notable people. Near the Avon factory, a bridge has been constructed to remember Frank Owen of Pentre Road, who died fighting in the Spanish Civil War.

There is also a memorial in place to remember victims of the colliery disaster, placed in Maerdy Park, and is a coal Dram filled with coal from Maerdy Colliery.  Also located in Maerdy park is a memorial dedicated to the memory of fallen World War I and World War II Soldiers.

A newer, updated War memorial has been erected adjacent to the Colliery memorial with the names of all the soldiers who died in both World War I and World War II.

In 2017, a memorial, known locally as the ‘Maerdy Gateway’ was created at the foot of the mountain road leading to neighbouring Aberdare. It consists of a pitwheel and a statue of a miner holding a child, wrapped in a traditional Welsh shawl, in memoriam and recognition of the area's booming coal industry.

Governance
The Maerdy electoral ward is coterminous with the community and elects one county councillor to Rhondda Cynon Taf County Borough Council. Since 1995 representation has flipped between the Labour Party and Plaid Cymru.

However, a 2018 review of electoral arrangements by the Local Democracy and Boundary Commission for Wales would see Maerdy ward merged with neighbouring Ferndale. The proposals would take effect from the 2022 council elections.

Transport
Passenger services were withdrawn in 1964, and the line closed completely in August 1986 after coal from Mardy Colliery was raised through Tower Colliery.

In 2005, RCT council constructed the A4223 Porth and Lower Rhondda Fach Relief Road (Porth Bypass) follows the old railway line through Ynyshir, past Wattstown and on to Pontygwaith. The northern section forms a branch to the Taff Trail cycleway.

Community Archives Wales
A group of interested residents takes part in the Maerdy Archive Group which is affiliated with the Community Archives Wales scheme to teach local residents how to upload articles of their community's history. The group has a large collection of photographs and ephemera about the development and expansion of the Maerdy area.
In 2002 the village was designated as a Communities First Area and a Partnership formed.

References

External links
www.geograph.co.uk : photos of Maerdy and surrounding area

Villages in Rhondda Cynon Taf
Rhondda Valley
Communities in Rhondda Cynon Taf
Wards of Rhondda Cynon Taf